Huskisson is a town in New South Wales, Australia in the City of Shoalhaven, on the shores of Jervis Bay. It is 24 km south-east of Nowra.

Etymology
Huskisson was named by Governor Sir George Gipps, after the British statesman William Huskisson.

Geography

Situated alongside Currambene Creek which also serves as an anchorage and fishing port. Huskisson is a prime tourist destination owing to its white sands and emerald waters (although Hyams Beach to the south is known to have finer white sands).

The town is bounded by Currambene Creek in the north, Moona Moona Creek in the south, the Jervis Bay shoreline and its beaches in the east, and Jervis Bay National Park in the west.

History

Aboriginal History 
The traditional owners of the area around Huskisson were a group of the Yuin. Well into the C20th, members of what local settlers called 'the Jervis Bay tribe' lived on the bank of Currambene Creek. The 'Jervis Bay tribe' are also known as the Wandandian people, They spoke Dharamba, which was probably the northernmost dialect of the Dhurga language. Huskisson lay very close to the linguistic boundary between the Dharamba dialect and the Thurawal language and the southern end of the traditional lands of the Thurawal people.

Origin of Huskisson 
The origin of Huskisson dates to the early 1840s. The land south of Moona Moona Creek—now Vincentia—was the site of the settlement of South Huskisson, founded in 1841 as a seaport and terminus of The Wool Road. South Huskisson lay on land originally owned by Edward Deas Thompson and was a ‘private town’.

The land to the north of Moona Moona Creek was a ‘government reserve”. When South Huskisson was planned, it was envisaged that the land north of Moona Moona Creek would become a ‘government township’. Allotments were sold both in South Huskisson (in 1841) and in the new 'government township' of Huskisson (in Feb.1843).

South Huskisson was not a success and was in rapid decline by 1850. Consequently, the 'government township' of Huskisson failed to develop. By the mid-1850s, town allotments in both Huskisson and South Huskisson were essentially worthless.

Huskisson only began to grow, when it became the site of shipbuilding in the early 1860s. In its early years, Huskisson was often referred to as ‘North Huskisson’ reverting to Huskisson, once the ruins of its privately-owned southern twin town—by then referred to as ‘the Old Township’—had all but disappeared.

Shipbuilding 

From 1864 to 1977, at least 131 registered wooden-hulled  vessels were built in Huskisson, in shipyards along Currumbene Creek. That number does not include the many unregistered wooden-hulled vessels—such as small boats, punts, barges, and timber lighters—that were also built there during that period.

The shipyards built sailing vessels and steamships, including schooners, tug-boats,  island-trading ships—for the firm of W.R. Carpenter & Co., during the 1930s and 1940s—and two passenger ferries for Sydney (Lady Denman  in 1911 and Lady Scott  in 1914).

Up to the late 1940s, vessels were built using the ‘work frame’ method in which frames were created using timber from natural crooks in trees (not bent using steam as is more common now). Until 1940, the town had no electricity; all vessels were built without power tools, other than a steam-operated saw-mill used to make planks. Timber was locally sourced, generally from within a few miles of the town.

During the Second World War, the Huskisson shipyard built four wooden-hulled vessels for the American Army, for use in the New Guinea campaign. After the war, the old shipbuilding techniques gave way to more modern methods and in later years most vessels built were wooden-hulled fishing trawlers.

The main shipyard owners were, in earlier years, the Dent family, and later the Setree family.

Services & Facilities 
During the early days of the settlement, a post office operated at 'Huskisson', from January 1843 up to the end of December 1855. A post office opened  'North Huskisson' in November 1875, and its first post master was Andrew Mackenzie, eldest son of John Mackenzie. By 1875, the ‘North Huskisson’ school was in operation. A telephone exchange opened in November 1912. In 1940, the town was connected to electricity.

There was a ‘Government Wharf used by the Illawarra Steam Navigation Company.

Tourism 
By the 1890s, Huskisson began to be a holiday destination. The Dent family opened the Jervis Bay Hotel in 1893 and operated guesthouses on the beachfront.

Demographics
The most common responses for religion were No Religion 34.0%, Anglican 24.7% and Catholic 17.7%.

Heritage listings 
Huskisson has a number of heritage-listed sites, including:
 Dent Street: MV Lady Denman

Notable people from Huskisson
John Storey, Premier of New South Wales, born in Huskisson 
 Olyroos goalkeeper Adam Federici
 Musician and athlete Paul Greene

References

External links

Lady Denman Heritage Complex 
VISITNSW.com - Huskisson

City of Shoalhaven
Towns in New South Wales
Towns in the South Coast (New South Wales)
Shipyards of New South Wales